Ettore Fieramosca is an 1833 historical novel by the Italian writer Massimo D'Azeglio. It is based on the life of the condottiero Ettore Fieramosca (1476-1515). During the era of Italian unification, Fieramosca was revived as a national hero, a trend which the novel contributed to. D'Azeglio was influenced by the writings of the Scottish author Walter Scott. Along with other patriotic writers of the era, D'Azeglio tried to counter stereotypes of Italian cowardice by showing the courage of Fieramosca and others  at the Challenge of Barletta in 1503.

Film adaptations
The novel inspired three separate films, including two silent films released in 1909 and 1915. During the Fascist era, with Fieramosca being actively promoted by the state as hero, a fresh film version was made in 1938 by the leading filmmaker Alessandro Blasetti.

References

Bibliography
 Bondanella, Peter E. Italian Cinema: From Neorealism to the Present. Bloomsbury Publishing, 2001.
 Casillo, Robert. The Empire of Stereotypes: Germaine de Staël and the Idea of Italy. Palgrave Macmillan, 2006

1833 novels
19th-century Italian novels
Novels set in the 16th century
Novels by Massimo D'Azeglio
Italian novels adapted into films
Italian historical novels